Mihai Ionuț Cotolan (born 18 January 1999) is a Romanian professional footballer who plays as a goalkeeper for Viitorul Dăești.

Club career

Voluntari
Cotolan played his first official game in Liga I in 2020, in a 3–3 draw against Academica Clinceni.

Personal life 
Mihai has a twin brother, Nicolae, who plays as centre back for CS Blejoi and also he is the younger brother of Bogdan Cotolan.

References

External links
 
 Mihai Cotolan at lpf.ro

1999 births
Living people
Romanian footballers
Association football goalkeepers
Liga I players
FC Voluntari players
Liga II players
FC Astra Giurgiu players
CS Pandurii Târgu Jiu players
Liga III players